Iman Mousavi (born February 5, 1989) is an Iranian footballer who most recently played for Shams Azar Qazvin in the League 2.

Club career
Mousavi played with Moghavemat Sepasi until 2011. Then, he signed with Naft Tehran. He moved to Esteghlal in December 2012 but was released by the club in the summer of 2013. He was then signed by Gostaresh Foolad.

On 4 July 2014, Mousavi signed a two-year contract with Foolad. He was the club's first sign under new coach Dragan Skočić.

Club career statistics

 Assist goals

International
Mousavi participated in the 2008 AFC U-19 Championship.

Honours
Esteghlal
Iran Pro League (1): 2012–13

References

1989 births
Living people
Fajr Sepasi players
Naft Tehran F.C. players
Gostaresh Foulad F.C. players
Iranian footballers
Esteghlal F.C. players
Persian Gulf Pro League players
Azadegan League players
Iran under-20 international footballers
Footballers at the 2010 Asian Games
Association football forwards
Asian Games competitors for Iran